The National Organization for Rare Disorders (NORD) is an American non-profit organization aiming to provide support for individuals with rare diseases by advocating and funding research, education, and networking among service providers. It was founded in 1983 by Abbey Meyers, along with individuals and rare diseases leaders of rare disease support groups, and it is a 501(c)3 tax exempt organization.

History
The organization grew out of an "informal coalition" of support groups and families called together in the late 1970s to advocate legislation supporting development of orphan drugs, or drugs for treating rare diseases. They succeeded in getting the United States Congress to pass the Orphan Drug Act (ODA) in early 1983.

The initial coalition was led by Abbey Meyers, whose son had Tourette syndrome. Tourette syndrome was estimated by the National Institutes of Health to affect 100,000 people in the United States. Meyers' son was helped by an experimental drug that the manufacturer ceased to develop because they assumed it would not be profitable enough. After passage of the Orphan Drug Act, the coalition founded NORD with Meyers as its president. In 2007 Meyers announced her retirement from the NORD presidency; the president is now Peter L. Saltonstall.

Since its founding in 1983, NORD continued to grow with the help of federal grants and donations.

Activities
NORD's operations include funding research on treatment and cures for rare diseases; lobbying for legislation to benefit the rare diseases community (in addition to the Orphan Drug Act, NORD has helped bring about legislation on publicizing clinical trials on the Internet, to give the public and medical professionals warning about projected drug shortages, and on the development of medical devices); spreading information about rare diseases; and helping individuals with rare diseases afford medication and treatment. In February 2009, NORD sponsored Rare Disease Day in the United States; this was the first time Rare Disease Day was observed in the United States (it was first observed in Europe in February 2008). NORD has also helped other countries to develop orphan drug legislation in their nations.

Organization

Corporate Council 
NORD maintains a Corporate Council made up of companies in the pharmaceutical, biotechnology and clinical research industries. Members include:

Partnerships 
NORD is engaged in partnerships with a number of patient advocacy groups and industry organizations. Partners include:

 Alliance for a Stronger FDA
 Alliance for Healthcare Reform
 Coalition for Accessible Treatments (CAT)
 EURORDIS-Rare Diseases Europe
 National Health Council
 Research!America
 State Access to Innovative Medicines Coalition (SAIM)
 United States Pharmacopeia (USP)

See also
 Rare Diseases Act of 2002

References

External links
Official site
NORD profile on GuideStar

Medical and health organizations based in Connecticut
Health charities in the United States
Patients' organizations
Charities based in Connecticut